HRG may refer to:

Science
 Histidine-rich glycoprotein, a plasma protein
 Human reference genome
 Hemispherical resonator gyroscope
 Horizontal ribbon growth, a method of crystal growth

Organizations
 HRG Engineering Company, a British car manufacturer
 HRG Group, an American holding company
 Healthcare Resource Group, within the English healthcare system
 Henley Residents Group, an English political party
 Hogg Robinson Group, a defunct corporate travel management company
 Home Retail Group, an English company
 Hostage Response Group of New South Wales, Australia

People
 Branko Hrg (born 1961), Croatian politician
 Noah Bennet (aka Horn Rimmed Glasses), a character in the TV series Heroes

Other
 Hurghada International Airport, in Egypt